The Shire of Herberton was a local government area  of Queensland. It was located on the Atherton Tableland, a plateau forming part of the Great Dividing Range west of the city of Cairns.

History

Tinaroo Division was created on 3 September 1881 under the Divisional Boards Act 1879, and was responsible for a large area which included Herberton. On 15 September 1888, the Borough of Herberton was established to manage the affairs of the town of Herberton. On 11 May 1895, the borough was abolished and the entire Herberton region separated from Tinaroo to become the Herberton Division. With the passage of the Local Authorities Act 1902, Herberton Division became the Shire of Herberton on 31 March 1903.

On 15 March 2008, under the Local Government (Reform Implementation) Act 2007 passed by the Parliament of Queensland on 10 August 2007, the Shire of Herberton merged with the Shires of Atherton, Eacham and Mareeba to form the Tablelands Region.

Towns and localities
The Shire of Herberton included the following settlements:

 Herberton
 Evelyn
 Innot Hot Springs
 Kalunga
 Millstream
 Moomin
 Mount Garnet
 Ravenshoe
 Tumoulin
 Wairuna
 Wondecla

Chairmen
 1908: Charles Harding 
 1927: F. A. Grigg

Population

References

Former local government areas of Queensland
Far North Queensland
2008 disestablishments in Australia
Populated places disestablished in 2008